Farmkids (styled as FARMkids) is an Australian children's computer-animated comedy television series about pampered zoo animals accidentally being shipped to a dude ranch. Thirteen episodes were broadcast in Series 1 and another thirteen in Series 2, both of which aired in 2007-2008.

Overview
The series is based around the irony of farm animals who know nothing about living in the countryside. They are a bunch of fastlane pampered city animals who live a star studded life in a popular nursery petting zoo, but their lives take a funny unexpected turn when they are suddenly relocated. To top it off their new home is nothing like one would expect from a simple old farm. At its core, this series is aiming at twisting and repackaging a strong and timeless farm theme into a fast, edgy comedy. Dude Ranch, the FARMkids new home, is a place where the old, modern and twilight zone elements meet to make this a way out of the ordinary environment. This is not the average city slickers on the Old MacDonald type of situation; Farmkids represents a twisted and very entertaining approach to a time tested theme.

Voice cast
Louise Brehmer as Bean, Poppit and Punky
Liz Buchanan as Frizz and Splat
Tiffany Lamb as MooLoo
Todd Levi as Gilly
Danny Murphy as Buster
Andrew Buchanan as Doogie, Rodd and Russ
Bill McDonald as Dumpster
Bryan Probets as Drumstick
John Harmon as Phill
Warren Humphreys as Carlos
Scott Strachan as Stretch

Episodes

Series One (2007)

Series Two (2008)

DVD release
In 2008, 3 DVDs were released entitled Chaos in the Country, Dude Ranch Boot Camp, and Hair, Wool, Feathers, and Fur.

Awards and nominations
As of November 2008, FARMkids and finalists in the Atom Awards for Best Children's Television Series.

References

External links
 Official FARMkids website
 

2000s Australian animated television series
2008 Australian television series debuts
2008 Australian television series endings
Australian children's animated comedy television series
Australian computer-animated television series
Animated television series about mammals